Cornelis Jacobsz. Delff (1570–1643) was a Dutch Golden Age still life painter.

Biography

Delff was born in Gouda.  According to Houbraken he was first a pupil of his father Jacob Delff, and then of Cornelis van Haarlem. He was the brother of the painter Willem Jacobsz Delff and a good painter of still lifes.

According to the RKD he became a member of the Delft Guild of St. Luke in 1613, and his kitchen still life paintings were followed by Sir Nathaniel Bacon (1585-1627), Gillis Gillisz. de Bergh, and Jan Willemsz. van der Wilde.  He died in Delft.

References

Cornelis Jacobsz. Delff on Artnet

External links
Vermeer and The Delft School, a full text exhibition catalog from The Metropolitan Museum of Art, which has material on Cornelis Jacobsz Delff

1570 births
1643 deaths
Dutch Golden Age painters
Dutch male painters
Artists from Delft
Painters from Delft
Dutch still life painters